You Are My Destiny or You're My Destiny may refer to:

Music 
 "You Are My Destiny" (song), a 1958 song by Paul Anka
 "Jai Ho! (You Are My Destiny)", a 2009 song by the Pussycat Dolls

Television 
 You Are My Destiny (2008 TV series), a 2008 South Korean series
 You Are My Destiny (2014 TV series), a South Korean series (also known as Fated to love you)
 You Are My Destiny (2020 TV series), a Chinese series with actress Liang Jie
 You're My Destiny (2017 TV series), a Thai series
 Fated to Love You (2008 TV series), a 2008 original Taiwanese television series also known as You're My Destiny

See also 
 Fated to Love You (disambiguation)